The following highways are numbered 793:

United States